The 1988 Wales rugby union tour of New Zealand was a series of rugby union games undertaken by the Wales national rugby union team to New Zealand. The tour consisted of six matches against regional teams and two Tests against New Zealand.

The tour was not a success for Wales, losing both Tests by heavy scores, and only winning two of the six matches against regional teams. The itinerary was a hard one and New Zealand coach Alex Wyllie stated that he would not have accepted a similar fixture list for his team. The team suffered badly from injuries and had to add six extra players during the course of the tour. Original tour captain Bleddyn Bowen broke his wrist in the second game and was replaced as skipper by Bob Norster, until he suffered a badly gashed knee, whereupon Jonathan Davies took over the captaincy.

Results
Scores and results list Wales's points tally first.

Touring party

Manager: R. Morgan
Coach: Tony Gray
Assistant coach: Derek Quinnell
Captain: Bleddyn Bowen, subsequently Bob Norster then Jonathan Davies

Full-backs
 Jonathan Mason replacement during tour
 Tony Clement
 Steve Bowling

Three-quarters
 Mark Ring
 Mike Hall
 Ieuan Evans
 John Devereux
 Nigel Davies
 Glen Webbe
 Carwyn Davies

Half-backs
 Jonathan Davies
 Jonathan Griffiths
 Robert Jones

Forwards
 Staff Jones
 Ian Watkins
 Dai Young
 Kevin Moseley
 Phil May
 Rowland Phillips
 David Bryant
 Gary Jones replacement during tour
 Mark Jones replacement during tour
 Kevin Phillips
 Bob Norster
 Paul Moriarty
 Tim Fauvel
 Anthony Buchanan
 Jeremy Pugh
 Phil May
 Richie Collins
 Mark Pugh replacement during tour
 Steve Sutton replacement during tour

Matches

See also
 History of rugby union matches between New Zealand and Wales

References

Wales tour
1988
1988
1988 in New Zealand rugby union
1987–88 in Welsh rugby union
History of rugby union matches between New Zealand and Wales